The Isuzu Erga (kana:いすゞ・エルガ) is a heavy-duty single-decker bus produced by Isuzu through the J-Bus joint venture. It is primarily available as a public bus in either a complete bus or a bus chassis. It is built by J-Bus from Japan either as a step-entrance bus (One-step and Two-step) or a low-floor bus (Non-step (Type A and Type B)).

First generation (2000-2015) 
The styling is completely different from the Cubic. The Isuzu Erga has a deep double-curvature windscreen and a rounded roof dome (more rounded as compared to the Cubic) with a separately mounted destination display. Its Hino-rebadged version is the Hino Blue Ribbon II.

Non-step (Type A), One-step and Two-step
 KL-LV280L1/N1/Q1 (2000) - 8PE1 engine (CNG: 8PF1)
 KK/KL-LT233J2 (2000) - 6HH1 engine
 PJ-LV234L1/N1/Q1 (2004) - 6HK1 engine (CNG: 8PF1)
 PKG/PDG-LV234L2/N2/Q2 (2007) - 6HK1 engine (CNG-MPI: 6HF1)
 LKG/LDG-LV234L3/N3/Q3 (2010) - 6HK1 engine
 QPG/QKG/QDG-LV234L3/N3/Q3 (2012) - 6HK1 engine
 QQG-LV234L3/N3 (2012) - 6HK1 engine with Eaton's parallel hybrid system and automatic/manual transmission
 QSG-LV234L3/N3 (2015) - 6HK1 engine with Eaton's parallel hybrid system and automatic/manual transmission

Non-step (Type B)
KL-LV834 (2000-2004) - 6HK1 engine (CNG: 6HA1) and ZF Ecomat as standard.

Second generation (2015–present) 
Non-step
 QRG/QPG/QKG/QDG-LV290N1/Q1 (2015) - 4HK1-TCS engine
 2TG/2PG/2KG/2DG-LV290N1/Q1 (2017) - 4HK1-TCH engine
 2SG-HL2ANBD/ASBD (2018) - A05C-K1 engine with Hino's parallel hybrid system and automatic/manual transmission

Isuzu Erga-J 
The Isuzu Erga-J is a rebadged Hino Rainbow HR. It has a rounded roof dome similar to the Erga with a deep double-curvature windscreen and a separately mounted destination display.
 KL-HR1JNEC (2000)
 PK-HR7JPAC (2004)

Model lineup 
 One-Step
 Two-Step
 Non-Step Type-A
 Non-Step Type-B

See also 

 List of buses

References

External links 

 Isuzu Erga Heavy-Duty Bus
 Isuzu Erga Homepage

Bus chassis
Buses of Japan
Low-floor buses
Step-entrance buses
Isuzu buses
Full-size buses
Vehicles introduced in 2000